Daniel Joseph Berrigan  (May 9, 1921 – April 30, 2016) was an American Jesuit priest, anti-war activist, Christian pacifist, playwright, poet, and author.

Berrigan's active protest against the Vietnam War earned him both scorn and admiration, especially regarding his association with the Catonsville Nine. It also landed him on the Federal Bureau of Investigation's "most wanted list" (the first-ever priest on the list), on the cover of Time magazine, and in prison.

For the rest of his life, Berrigan remained one of the United States' leading anti-war activists. In 1980, he co-founded the Plowshares movement, an anti-nuclear protest group, that put him back into the national spotlight. Berrigan was an award-winning and prolific author of some 50 books, a teacher, and a university educator.

Early life
Berrigan was born in Virginia, Minnesota, the son of Thomas Berrigan, a second-generation Irish Catholic and active trade union member, and Frieda Berrigan (née Fromhart), who was of German ancestry. He was the fifth of six sons. His youngest brother was fellow peace activist Philip Berrigan.

At age 5, Berrigan's family moved to Syracuse, New York. In 1946, Berrigan earned a bachelor's degree from St. Andrew-on-Hudson, a Jesuit seminary in Hyde Park, New York. In 1952 he received a master's degree from Woodstock College in Baltimore, Maryland.

Berrigan was devoted to the Catholic Church throughout his youth. He joined the Jesuits directly out of high school in 1939 and was ordained to the priesthood on June 19, 1952.

Career
Berrigan taught at St. Peter's Preparatory School in Jersey City from 1946 to 1949.

In 1954, Berrigan was assigned to teach French and theology at the Jesuit Brooklyn Preparatory School. In 1957 he was appointed professor of New Testament studies at Le Moyne College in Syracuse, New York. The same year, he won the Lamont Prize for his book of poems, Time Without Number. He developed a reputation as a religious radical, working actively against poverty and on changing the relationship between priests and lay people. While at Le Moyne, he founded its International House.

While on a sabbatical from Le Moyne in 1963, Berrigan traveled to Paris and met French Jesuits who criticized the social and political conditions in Indochina. Taking inspiration from this, he and his brother Philip founded the Catholic Peace Fellowship, a group that organized protests against the war in Vietnam.

On October 28, 1965, Berrigan, along with the Rev. Richard John Neuhaus and Rabbi Abraham Joshua Heschel, founded an organization known as Clergy and Laymen Concerned About Vietnam (CALCAV). The organization, founded at the Church Center for the United Nations, was joined by the likes of Dr. Hans Morgenthau, the Rev. Reinhold Niebuhr, the Rev. William Sloane Coffin, and the Rev. Philip Berrigan, among many others. The Rev. Dr. Martin Luther King Jr., who delivered his 1967 speech Beyond Vietnam: A Time to Break Silence under sponsorship from CALCAV, served as the national co-chairman of the organization.

From 1966 to 1970, Berrigan was the assistant director of the Cornell University United Religious Work (CURW), the umbrella organization for all religious groups on campus, including the Cornell Newman Club (later the Cornell Catholic Community), eventually becoming the group's pastor. Berrigan was the first faculty advisor of Cornell University's first gay rights student group, the Student Homophile League, in 1968.

Berrigan at one time or another held faculty positions or ran programs at Union Theological Seminary, Loyola University New Orleans, Columbia, Cornell, and Yale. His longest tenure was at Fordham (a Jesuit university located in the Bronx), where for a brief time he also served as poet-in-residence.

Berrigan appeared briefly in the 1986 Warner Bros. film The Mission, playing a Jesuit priest. He also served as a consultant on the film.

Activism

Vietnam War era 

Berrigan, his brother and Josephite priest Philip Berrigan, and Trappist monk Thomas Merton founded an interfaith coalition against the Vietnam War and wrote letters to major newspapers arguing for an end to the war. In 1967, Berrigan witnessed the public outcry that followed from the arrest of his brother Philip, for pouring blood on draft records as part of the Baltimore Four. Philip was sentenced to six years in prison for defacing government property. The fallout he had to endure from these many interventions, including his support for prisoners of war and, in 1968, seeing firsthand the conditions on the ground in Vietnam, further radicalized Berrigan, or at least strengthened his determination to resist American military imperialism.

Berrigan traveled to Hanoi with Howard Zinn during the Tet Offensive in January 1968 to "receive" three American airmen, the first American prisoners of war released by the North Vietnamese since the US bombing of that nation had begun.

In 1968, he signed the Writers and Editors War Tax Protest pledge, vowing to refuse to make tax payments in protest of the Vietnam War. In the same year, he was interviewed in the anti-Vietnam War documentary film In the Year of the Pig, and later that year became involved in radical non-violent protest.

Catonsville Nine

Daniel Berrigan and his brother Philip, along with seven other Catholic protesters, used homemade napalm to destroy 378 draft files in the parking lot of the Catonsville, Maryland, draft board on May 17, 1968. This group, which came to be known as the Catonsville Nine, issued a statement after the incident:

Berrigan was arrested and sentenced to three years in prison, but went into hiding with the help of fellow radicals prior to imprisonment. While on the run, Berrigan was interviewed for Lee Lockwood's documentary The Holy Outlaw. The Federal Bureau of Investigation apprehended him on August 11, 1970, at the home of William Stringfellow and Anthony Towne on Block Island. Berrigan was then imprisoned at the Federal Correctional Institution in Danbury, Connecticut until his release on February 24, 1972.

In retrospect, the trial of the Catonsville Nine was significant, because it "altered resistance to the Vietnam War, moving activists from street protests to repeated acts of civil disobedience, including the burning of draft cards". As The New York Times noted in its obituary, Berrigan's actions helped "shape the tactics of opposition to the Vietnam War."

Plowshares movement

On September 9, 1980, Berrigan, his brother Philip, and six others (the "Plowshares Eight") began the Plowshares movement. They trespassed onto the General Electric nuclear missile facility in King of Prussia, Pennsylvania, where they damaged nuclear warhead nose cones and poured blood onto documents and files. They were arrested and charged with over ten different felony and misdemeanor counts. On April 10, 1990, after ten years of appeals, Berrigan's group was re-sentenced and paroled for up to  months in consideration of time already served in prison. Their legal battle was re-created in Emile de Antonio's 1982 film In the King of Prussia, which starred Martin Sheen and featured appearances by the Plowshares Eight as themselves.

Consistent life ethic 

Berrigan endorsed a consistent life ethic, a morality based on a holistic reverence for life. As a member of the Rochester, New York-area consistent life ethic advocacy group Faith and Resistance Community, he protested via civil disobedience against abortion at a new Planned Parenthood clinic in 1991.

AIDS activism
Berrigan said of pastoral care to AIDS patients:

Berrigan published Sorrow Built a Bridge: Friendship and AIDS reflecting on his experiences ministering to AIDS patients through the Supportive Care Program at St. Vincent's Hospital and Medical Center in 1989. The Religious Studies Review wrote, "the strength of this volume lies in its capacity to portray sensitively the impact of AIDS on human lives." Speaking about AIDS patients, many of whom were gay, The Charlotte Observer quoted Berrigan saying in 1991, "Both the church and the state are finding ways to kill people with AIDS, and one of the ways is ostracism that pushes people between the cracks of respectability or acceptability and leaves them there to make of life what they will or what they cannot."

Other activism

Although much of his later work was devoted to assisting AIDS patients in New York City, Berrigan still held to his activist roots throughout his life. He maintained his opposition to American interventions abroad, from Central America in the 1980s, through the Gulf War in 1991, the Kosovo War, the US invasion of Afghanistan, and the 2003 invasion of Iraq. He was also an opponent of capital punishment, a contributing editor of Sojourners, and a supporter of the Occupy movement.

P. G. Coy, P. Berryman, D. L. Anderson, and others consider Berrigan to be a Christian anarchist.

In media
 January 25, 1971: Featured on the cover of Time along with his brother Philip.
 Adrienne Rich's poem "The Burning of Paper Instead of Children" makes numerous references to the Catonsville Nine and includes an epigraph from Daniel Berrigan during the trial ("I was in danger of verbalizing my moral impulses out of existence").
 It is frequently claimed that "the radical priest" in Paul Simon's song "Me and Julio Down by the Schoolyard" refers to or was inspired by Berrigan
 Lynne Sachs's documentary film Investigation of a Flame is about the Berrigan brothers and the Catonsville Nine.
 Berrigan appeared briefly in the 1986 Roland Joffé film The Mission, which starred Robert De Niro and Jeremy Irons.
 Berrigan's play The Trial of the Catonsville Nine (1970) premiered at the Lyceum Theatre in New York City on June 2, 1971. The original cast featured the talents of Biff McGuire, Michael Moriarty, Josef Sommer, Sam Waterston, and James Woods, among others. Gordon Davidson received a 1972 Tony Award nomination for his direction of the play.
 The Trial of the Catonsville Nine was adapted in a 1972 film of the same name, produced by Gregory Peck and starring Ed Flanders as Berrigan.
 Berrigan is interviewed in Emile de Antonio's 1968 Vietnam War documentary In the Year of the Pig.
 Berrigan is featured in Emile de Antonio's 1983 film In the King of Prussia, also starring fellow activist Martin Sheen.
 Berrigan's oral history is included in the 2006 book Generation on Fire: Voices of Protest from the 1960s by Jeff Kisseloff. 
 Berrigan's involvement with the Catonsville Nine is explored in the 2013 documentary Hit & Stay.
 Dar Williams' song "I Had No Right" from her album The Green World is about Berrigan and his trial.
In the 2022 television adaptation of the podcast Slow Burn, an anti-war protester brings up the Berrigan brothers.

Death
Berrigan died in the Bronx, New York City on April 30, 2016 at Murray-Weigel Infirmary, the Jesuit infirmary at Fordham University. Since 1975, he had lived on the Upper West Side at the West Side Jesuit Community.

Awards and recognition
 1956: Lamont Poetry Selection
 1974: War Resisters League Peace Award 
 1974: Gandhi Peace Award (accepted then resigned)
 1988: Thomas Merton Award
 1989: Pax Christi USA Pope Paul VI Teacher of Peace Award
 1991: The Peace Abbey Foundation Courage of Conscience Award
 1993: Pacem in Terris Award
 2008: Honorary Degree from the College of Wooster
 2017: Daniel Berrigan Center at Benincasa Community, 133 W. 70th Street, New York, NY 10023

See also 
 Christian pacifism
 List of fugitives from justice who disappeared
 List of peace activists
 Catholic Worker Movement
 Dorothy Day

Notes

References

Further reading

 
 Jim Forest, At Play in the Lions' Den: A Biography and Memoir of Daniel Berrigan (Orbis Books 2017)
 Francine du Plessix Gray, Divine Disobedience: Profiles in Catholic Radicalism (Knopf, 1970)
 Daniel Berrigan Papers (finding aid) Special Collections and Archives, DePaul University
 Murray Polner and Jim O'Grady, Disarmed and Dangerous: The Radical Lives and Times of Daniel and Philip Berrigan, Brothers in Religious Faith & Civil Disobedience (Basic Books, 1997 and Westview Press, 1998)
 Murray Polner Papers, DePaul University Special Collections and Archives (notes and documents from writing Disarmed and Dangerous: The Radical Lives & Times of Daniel & Philip Berrigan)
 Daniel Cosacchi and Eric Martin, eds., The Berrigan Letters: Personal Correspondence between Daniel and Philip Berrigan (Orbis Books, 2016)

External links

 Plowshares Movement Chronology
 
 Berrigan Brothers And The Harrisburg Seven Trial, 1970–1989 at the Internet Archive
 Daniel and Philip Berrigan Collection, 1880–1995 at Division of Rare and Manuscript Collections, Cornell University Library
 Daniel Berrigan Papers  at Special Collections and Archives, DePaul University
 

1921 births
2016 deaths
20th-century American Jesuits
21st-century American Jesuits
Activists from Syracuse, New York
American anti-abortion activists
American anti–death penalty activists
American anti–nuclear weapons activists
American anti–Vietnam War activists
American anti-war activists
American Christian pacifists
American male poets
American people of German descent
American people of Irish descent
American Roman Catholic priests
American tax resisters
Catholic Workers
Catholics from Minnesota
DePaul University Special Collections and Archives holdings
FBI Ten Most Wanted Fugitives
Fordham University faculty
HIV/AIDS activists
Le Moyne College faculty
Non-interventionism
Nonviolence advocates
People from the Upper West Side
People from Virginia, Minnesota
Religious leaders from Syracuse, New York
Roman Catholic activists
American consistent life ethics activists